Prosperity is the  flourishing, thriving, good fortune and successful social status. Prosperity often produces profuse wealth including other factors which can be profusely wealthy in all degrees, such as happiness and health.

Competing notions of prosperity
Economic notions of prosperity often compete or interact negatively with health, happiness, or spiritual notions of prosperity. For example, longer hours of work might result in an increase in certain measures of economic prosperity, but at the expense of driving people away from their preferences for shorter work hours. In Buddhism, prosperity is viewed with an emphasis on collectivism and spirituality. This perspective can be at odds with capitalistic notions of prosperity, due to the latter's association with greed. Data from social surveys show that an increase in income does not result in a lasting increase in happiness; one proposed explanation to this is due to hedonic adaptation and social comparison, and a failure to anticipate these factors, resulting in people not allocating enough energy to non-financial goals such as family life and health.

Debate under economic growth
Economic growth is often seen as essential for economic prosperity, and indeed is one of the factors that is used as a measure of prosperity. The Rocky Mountain Institute, among others, has put forth an alternative point of view, that prosperity does not require growth, claiming instead that many of the problems facing communities are actually a result of growth, and that sustainable development requires abandoning the idea that growth is required for prosperity. The debate over whether economic growth is necessary for, or at odds with, human prosperity, has been active at least since the publication of Our Common Future in 1987, and has been pointed to as reflecting two opposing worldviews.

In 1996, the British ecological economist Tim Jackson outlined the conflicting relationship between human wellbeing and economic growth in his book Material Concerns. Prosperity without Growth then, first published as a report to the UK Sustainable Development Commission in 2008, comprehensively expanded on the arguments and policy recommendations.

Internationally organised, the Degrowth movement is taking a similar position and argue that overconsumption lies at the root of long-term environmental issues and social inequalities, advocating for the down-scaling of production and consumption.  In the 2021 Review on the Economics of Biodiversity commissioned by the UK Treasury, Partha Dasgupta argues prosperity has come at a "devastating" cost to biodiversity, and that sustainable economic growth will require abandoning GDP as a measure for economic progress.

Synergistic notions of prosperity
Many distinct notions of prosperity, such as economic prosperity, health, and happiness, are correlated or even have causal effects on each other. Economic prosperity and health are well-established to have a positive correlation, but the extent to which health has a causal effect on economic prosperity is unclear.

There is evidence that happiness is a cause of good health, both directly through influencing behavior and the immune system, and indirectly through social relationships, work, and other factors. One study which advances a holistic definition of prosperity is the Legatum Prosperity Index (an annual report by the Legatum Institute, a UK-based independent educational charity founded by Legatum), which uses data from 56 separate sources, including the World Health Organisation, Global slavery Index and World Bank, to rank 169 nations in an index which goes beyond GDP as a measurement of national prosperity.

Ecological perspectives
In ecology, prosperity can refer to the extent to which a species flourishes under certain circumstances.

See also 
 Prosperity Without Growth
 Material Concerns

References

External links 

 The Legatum Prosperity Index homepage
 Centre for the Understanding of Sustainable Prosperity | Homepage

Economic growth